The following is a list of New Zealand national football team managers, by order of appointment.

List of managers
The following table provides a summary of the complete record of each New Zealand manager including their progress in both the World Cup, Confederations Cup and the Nations Cup.
Statistics correct as of 3 March 2022

References
General

External links

     
New Zealand